Peter Gray Fernie (16 January 1862 – 9 August 1942) was a Scottish professional golfer and clubmaker.

Early life
Fernie was born in St Andrews, Scotland, in 1862. He had a brother, William, who was also a professional golfer.

Golf career
Fernie trained as a professional in St Andrews under Old Tom Morris. He moved to England, and worked as the professional at the London Scottish Club on Wimbledon Common until 1900, when he went to Ipswich. In 1915, he was involved in a case contesting a patent for golf ball dimples that had been granted; largely based on the evidence Fernie gave, that he had created a ball with indentations in 1897, the patent was revoked.

As a player, Fernie competed in many exhibition matches against leading players, and a few professional tournaments. He played in The Open Championship on six occasions, and had one top10 finish, in 1884 at Prestwick, when he tied for ninth place with Jack Kirkaldy.

Death
On retiring, Fernie moved back to St Andrews, where he died on 9 August 1942.

Results in The Open Championship

Note: Fernie played only in The Open Championship.

DNP = Did not play
WD = Withdrew
"T" indicates a tie for a place
Yellow background for top-10

References

Scottish male golfers
Golfers from St Andrews
1862 births
1942 deaths